Maducarai is a panchayat village in Nettapakkam Commune in the Union Territory of Puducherry, India. It is also a revenue village under Nettapakkam firka. Muducarai consists of two village panchayats namely Maducarai(East) and Maducarai(West).

Geography
Maducarai is bordered by Kariamanickam in the east and rest of three sides bordered by Tamil nadu villages.

Transport
Maducarai is located at 32 km. from Pondicherry. Maducarai can be reached directly by any bus running between Pondicherry and Maducarai.

Road Network
Maducarai is connected to Pondicherry by Mangalam - Maducarai State Highway (RC-19).

Tourism

Marakaleswarar Temple
Marakaleswarar Temple is one of the ancient temple in Puducherry. 
It belongs to Chozha period.

Freedom Fighters Arch
Freedom Fighters Centenary Year Memorial Arch is located on Siruvandhadu road. The pillars in the arch has the list of freedom fighters who fought for the merger of Pondicherry with the Indian Union.

People from Maducarai
 V. Venkatasubha Reddiar, freedom fighter and politician, was a Chief minister of Pondicherry.
 V. Vaithilingam, politician, was a Chief minister of Pondicherry.
 M. D. R. Ramachandran, politician, was a Chief minister of Pondicherry.

Gallery

Politics
Maducarai is a part of Nettapakkam (Union Territory Assembly constituency) which comes under Puducherry (Lok Sabha constituency)

References

External links
 Official website of the Government of the Union Territory of Puducherry

Villages in Puducherry district